Cheritra freja, the common imperial, is a small butterfly found in India, Myanmar, Malaysia and Sri Lanka that belongs to the gossamer-winged butterflies family (Lycaenidae).

Subspecies
The subspecies of Cheritra freja are-

 Cheritra freja freja - Myanmar, Thailand
 Cheritra freja butleri Cowan, 1965 – south India
 Cheritra freja evansi Cowan, 1965 – northeast India, Myanmar, Thailand, Laos, Vietnam
 Cheritra freja fracta Cowan, 1967 – Bangka
 Cheritra freja frigga Fruhstorfer, 1912 – peninsular Malaya, Singapore, Sumatra
 Cheritra freja jafra (Godart, [1824]) – Java, Bali
 Cheritra freja pallida (Druce, 1873) – Borneo, Pulau Laut
 Cheritra freja pseudojafra Moore, [1881] – Sri Lanka
 Cheritra freja sabanga Toxopeus, 1929 – Pulau Weh

Description
The butterfly has a brown upperside with white bands. The hindwings consist of a tail. It is coloured from pale yellow to white on the lower side with black margins.

See also
List of butterflies of India
List of butterflies of India (Lycaenidae)

References

 
 
 
 
 
 

Cheritra
Butterflies of Asia
Butterflies of Singapore
Taxa named by Johan Christian Fabricius
Butterflies described in 1793